Basted is a hamlet in the Tonbridge and Malling district, in the county of Kent, England.

Nearby settlements

Town
 Sevenoaks

Villages
 Borough Green
 Ightham

Hamlets
 Claygate Cross
 Crouch

Transport links

Railway
 Borough Green & Wrotham railway station

Roads
 A-roads: A20, A25, A227
 Motorways: M20, M25, M26

References

Hamlets in Kent
Tonbridge and Malling